The Woolpack cricket ground was an 18th-century cricket venue in Islington, used for matches in 1729 and 1732.

The ground's location has been described as behind the Woolpack Inn.

Two known matches were played at the Woolpack. In August 1729, Gentlemen of Middlesex v Gentlemen of London was due to take place at the Woolpack Back Gate near Sadler's Wells". In August 1732, London v Middlesex was advertised to be played in "the field behind the Woolpack at Islington".

References

1729 establishments in England
Cricket grounds in Middlesex
Cricket in Middlesex
Defunct cricket grounds in England
Defunct sports venues in London
English cricket venues in the 18th century
History of the London Borough of Islington
History of Middlesex
Sport in the London Borough of Islington
Islington
Sports venues completed in 1729
Sports venues in London